Alexander Moroz (1961–2009) was a Ukrainian chess grandmaster.

Alexander Moroz or Oleksandr Moroz (Ukrainian Олександр Мороз; Russian Александр Мороз) may also refer to:

Oleksandr Moroz (born 1944),  Ukrainian statesman and politician
Oleksandr Moroz (born 1952), Ukrainian footballer and later coach with FC Dynamo Kyiv
Alexander Moroz, Belarusian captain of 2016 rescue vessel Aquarius (NGO ship)
Oleksandr Moroz, Ukrainian silver medalist in Swimming at the 2015 European Youth Summer Olympic Festival

See also
Moroz (surname)